The 1962 Australia rugby union tour of New Zealand was a series of thirteen matches played by the Wallabies in August and September 1962.

This tour was made two months after the All Blacks had toured Australia. The result of the first test was a draw but the Wallabies were defeated in the other two tests. So the Bledisloe Cup, contested for the first time since 1962 remained with New Zealand. 

The tour marked the commencement of the successful "Thornett Era" of Australian Rugby, buoyed by the leadership skills of skipper John Thornett and the outstanding skills of greats of the game like Ken Catchpole, Peter Johnson and Rob Heming. It was the debut tour of Dick Marks and Peter Crittle who would later serve as influential administrators of Australian rugby.

The Matches
Scores and results list Australia's points tally first.

Notes 

Australia national rugby union team tours of New Zealand
Tour
tour